Arnaudov (Bulgarian, Macedonian or Russian: Арнаудов) is a Bulgarian masculine surname, its feminine counterpart is Arnaudova. It may refer to
Georgi Arnaudov (footballer, born 1929) (1929–2001), Bulgarian football forward
Georgi Arnaudov (footballer, born 1974) (born 1974), Bulgarian football goalkeeper
Kristina Arnaudova (born 1979), pop singer from Republic of Macedonia
Petia Arnaudova, Bulgarian physician 
Tsanko Arnaudov (born 1992), Bulgarian-born Portuguese shot putter

Bulgarian-language surnames